Lípa nad Orlicí is a municipality and village in Rychnov nad Kněžnou District in the Hradec Králové Region of the Czech Republic. It has about 600 inhabitants.

Administrative parts
The village of Dlouhá Louka is an administrative part of Lípa nad Orlicí.

History
The first written mention of Lípa nad Orlicí is from 1396.

References

Villages in Rychnov nad Kněžnou District